Ethabuka Reserve is a  nature reserve in Central West Queensland, Australia,  north-west of Bedourie,  south-west of Boulia and  south of Mount Isa. It lies at the northern end of the Simpson Desert with its western boundary bordering the Northern Territory.  It is owned and managed by Bush Heritage Australia (BHA), who also own the adjacent property, Pilungah Reserve. The elevation of the reserve terrain is 99 meters.

History
Ethabuka was offered as a pastoral lease from 1910, though it was not taken up until 1946.  It was operated as a beef cattle station until acquisition by BHA in 2004.

Landscape
Ethabuka is characterised by dunefields and the associated swales, with clay and gibber floodplains.  It contains the nationally significant Pulchera waterhole, a semi-permanent wetland fed by the ephemeral Mulligan River.  Vegetation communities include gidgee woodlands.

Fauna
Ethabuka is rich in desert wildlife.  Mammals recorded on the property include the mulgara, Forrest's mouse, spinifex hopping mouse, brown desert mouse and sandy inland mouse.  Reptiles include the woma python.  Threatened bird species recorded are the Australian bustard, yellow chat, painted honeyeater and chestnut quail-thrush.  The reserve is part of the Simpson Desert Important Bird Area (IBA), identified as such by BirdLife International for its importance in conserving suitable habitat for Eyrean grasswrens.

References

External links
 Bush Heritage Australia

Bush Heritage Australia reserves
Nature reserves in Queensland
2004 establishments in Australia
Important Bird Areas of Queensland
Central West Queensland